Be Inc. was an American computer company founded in 1990. It is best known for the development and release of BeOS, and the BeBox personal computer. Be was founded by former Apple Computer executive Jean-Louis Gassée with capital from Seymour Cray.

Be's corporate offices were located in Menlo Park, California, with regional sales offices in France and Japan. The company later relocated to Mountain View, California for the duration of its dissolution.

The company's main intent was to develop a new operating system using the C++ programming language on a proprietary hardware platform. BeOS was initially exclusive to the BeBox, and was later ported to Apple Computer's Power Macs despite resistance from Apple, due to the hardware specifications assistance of Power Computing. In 1998, BeOS was ported to the Intel x86 architecture, and PowerPC support was reduced and finally dropped after BeOS R5. It inspired the open source operating system, Haiku.

History 
Be was founded by former Apple Computer executive Jean-Louis Gassée in 1990 with Steve Sakoman after being ousted by Apple CEO John Sculley. Soon joined also Erich Ringewald, lead engineer in Apple 'Pink' OS team, as CTO.

According to several sources including Macworld UK, the company name "Be" originated in a conversation between Gassée and Sakoman. Gassée originally thought the company should be called "United Technoids Inc.", but Sakoman disagreed and said he would start looking through the dictionary for a better name. A few days later, when Gassée asked if he had made any progress, Sakoman replied that he had got tired and stopped at "B." Gassée said, " 'Be' is nice. End of story."

Be aimed to create a modern computer operating system written in C++ on a proprietary hardware platform. In 1995, the BeBox personal computer was released by Be, with its distinctive strips of lights along the front that indicate the activity of each PowerPC CPU, and the combined analogue/digital, 37-pin GeekPort. In addition to BeOS and BeBox, Be also produced BeIA, an OS for internet appliances. Its commercial deployments included the Sony eVilla and DT Research, during its short lifespan.

In 1996, Apple was searching for a new operating system to replace the classic Mac OS. Eventually, the two final options were BeOS and NeXTSTEP. NeXT was chosen and acquired due to the persuasive influence of Steve Jobs and the incomplete state of the BeOS product, criticized at the time for lacking such features as printing capability. It was rumoured that the deal fell apart because of money, with Be Inc allegedly wanting US$500M and a high-level post in the company, when the NeXT deal closed at US$400M. The rumours were dismissed by Gassée.

Dissolution and litigation
Ultimately the assets of the Be, Inc. were bought for US$11 million in 2001 by Palm, Inc., where Gassée served on the board of directors, at which point the company entered dissolution. The company then initiated litigation against Microsoft for aggressively anti-competitive and monopolistic business practices. Joining a long history of antitrust lawsuits against Microsoft, Be specifically contested Microsoft's prohibition of OEMs to allow dual-boot systems containing both Microsoft and non-Microsoft operating systems. The suit was settled in September 2003 with a US$23.25 million payout to Be, Inc.

Palm subsequently spun off a wholly owned subsidiary PalmSource to develop its Palm OS and related software, with the Be assets being transferred to PalmSource which was subsequently acquired by Japanese-based ACCESS.

Legacy
The open source operating system Haiku resumed BeOS's legacy in the form of a complete reimplementation. Beta 1 of Haiku was released in September 2018. As of then, there is an active development team with nightly releases.

References 

 
1990 establishments in California
2001 disestablishments in California
Companies based in Menlo Park, California
Computer companies established in 1990
Computer companies disestablished in 2001
Defunct companies based in the San Francisco Bay Area
Defunct computer companies based in California
Defunct computer companies of the United States
Defunct computer hardware companies
Defunct software companies of the United States
Home computer hardware companies
Software companies based in the San Francisco Bay Area